Rainbow City is a city in Etowah County, Alabama, United States. It incorporated in 1950. The population was 9,602 at the 2010 census. It is part of the Gadsden Metropolitan Statistical Area.

History
This city was named after U.S. Highway 411, called Rainbow Drive, which runs through the middle of the city.

Hernando de Soto's troops were the first visitors to the area in 1540. In 1818, families from the Carolinas and Georgia began to migrate to the area and homestead land near the Coosa River, calling the area "Coosa Bend". This area was later called "Morgan's Cross Road", located at the intersection of the Gadsden-Ashville Road and Gilbert's Ferry Road.

John Sheffield Jones, the grandson of an original settler, donated $1,000 and the land for the construction of the first John S. Jones Elementary School. This school later burned to the ground; a new elementary school was built and serves the Rainbow City area today.  

On April 2, 1831, a church was organized at the Harmony Meeting House. A few years later, the first Baptist association was organized. Harmony was one of the first five members in the association. The adjoining cemetery, Old Harmony Cemetery, has been declared a historic landmark.

Education

The city is served by the Etowah County Board of Education. The city has one public elementary school, and shares a middle and high school with neighboring Southside. There is also a private school for the city. 

John S. Jones is one of several elementary schools in the area. It houses grades K-5.

Rainbow Middle School
Rainbow Middle School is the shared middle school for the area of Southside and Rainbow City. It houses grades 6–8. During the September 11 Attacks the school was declared a National Shelter for victims.

Southside High School
Southside is the shared high school for the area of Southside and Rainbow City. It houses grades 9–12.

Westbrook Christian School 
Westbrook is a private school that houses grades PreK-12.

Geography
Rainbow City is located in southern Etowah County at  (33.943964, −86.061546). It is bordered to the northeast by Gadsden, the county seat, to the southeast by the Coosa River, across which is the city of Southside, and to the southwest, across Little Canoe Creek, by the town of Steele in St. Clair County.

U.S. Route 411 (Rainbow Drive) is the main road through the city, leading northeast  to the center of Gadsden and southwest  to Ashville. Alabama State Route 77 (Grand Avenue) crosses US 411 in the center of Rainbow City, leading northwest  to Interstate 59 at Exit 181 and south  to Lincoln.

Demographics

2000 census
As of the census of 2000, there were 8,428 people, 3,586 households, and 2,517 families residing in the city. The racial makeup of the city was 93.09% White, 3.51% Black or African American, 0.34% Native American, 1.45% Asian, 0.51% from other races, and 1.09% from two or more races. 1.45% of the population were Hispanic or Latino of any race.

There were 3,586 households, out of which 30.6% had children under the age of 18 living with them, 56.9% were married couples living together, 11.0% had a female householder with no husband present, and 29.8% were non-families. 27.0% of all households were made up of individuals, and 10.6% had someone living alone who was 65 years of age or older. The average household size was 2.35 and the average family size was 2.84.

In the city, the population was spread out, with 23.0% under the age of 18, 8.0% from 18 to 24, 28.8% from 25 to 44, 25.7% from 45 to 64, and 14.6% who were 65 years of age or older. The median age was 39 years. For every 100 females, there were 89.9 males. For every 100 females age 18 and over, there were 87.2 males.

The median income for a household in the city was $40,216, and the median income for a family was $50,844. Males had a median income of $38,278 versus $26,483 for females. The per capita income for the city was $20,860. About 6.9% of families and 8.4% of the population were below the poverty line, including 9.7% of those under age 18 and 7.5% of those age 65 or over.

2010 census
As of the census of 2010, there were 9,602 people, 4,113 households, and 2,721 families residing in the city. The racial makeup of the city was 87.4% White, 7.2% Black or African American, 0.4% Native American, 2.6% Asian, 1.0% from other races, and 1.4% from two or more races. 2.4% of the population were Hispanic or Latino of any race.

There were 4,113 households, out of which 27.9% had children under the age of 18 living with them, 49.1% were married couples living together, 13.3% had a female householder with no husband present, and 33.8% were non-families. 29.9% of all households were made up of individuals, and 12.3% had someone living alone who was 65 years of age or older. The average household size was 2.33 and the average family size was 2.88.

In the city, the population was spread out, with 22.9% under the age of 18, 8.5% from 18 to 24, 24.8% from 25 to 44, 27.0% from 45 to 64, and 16.8% who were 65 years of age or older. The median age was 40.5 years. For every 100 females, there were 90.3 males. For every 100 females age 18 and over, there were 90.0 males.

The median income for a household in the city was $40,236, and the median income for a family was $60,000. Males had a median income of $45,593 versus $32,421 for females. The per capita income for the city was $23,422. About 10.5% of families and 12.6% of the population were below the poverty line, including 21.1% of those under age 18 and 7.8% of those age 65 or over.

2020 census

As of the 2020 United States census, there were 10,191 people, 3,847 households, and 2,508 families residing in the city.

Politics and government
The current mayor of Rainbow City is Joe Taylor, who was first elected in 2020.The Current City Council consists of Anita Bedwell, Randy Vice, Clark Hopper, Jeff Prince, and Jameson Jenkins.

Notable people
Brodie Croyle, former Alabama quarterback and retired NFL player
Patrick Nix, former Auburn quarterback and current high school football coach in Pinson Valley

References

External links
Rainbow City official website

Cities in Alabama
Cities in Etowah County, Alabama